The Sparrows of Paris (French: Moineaux de Paris) is a 1953 French comedy drama film directed and written by Maurice Cloche and starring Jean-Pierre Aumont, Louis de Funès and Virginia Keiley.

Plot
Impresario Mr. Smith and his daughter want to engage a group of French musicians. On this occasion, Peggy Smith wears a necklace with a locket. One of the musicians identifies the locket as property of his grandmother. When Ms. Smith insists on keeping it, the musician calls for his ancestors, and the reborn French elite soldier Césarin answers.

Cast 
 Jean-Pierre Aumont as Césarin, Horse Grenadier of the Imperial Guard (Napoleon I)
 Louis de Funès as the doctor
 Virginia Keiley as Peggy Smith, the impresario's daughter
 Max Elloy as P'tit Louis
 Robert Lombard as the choir school manager 
 Louis Gimberg as Mr Smith, the American impresario
 Little Singers of the Wooden Cross as Themselves
 Philippe Olive
 Paul Demange
 Léonce Corne
 André Dalibert
 Odette Barencey
 Jacques Famery
 Emile Morel

References

External links 
 
 Moineaux de Paris (1952) at the Films de France
 Moineaux de Paris (1952) at Uni France films

1953 films
1950s musical comedy-drama films
1950s ghost films
French musical comedy-drama films
French fantasy comedy-drama films
French musical fantasy films
1950s French-language films
French black-and-white films
Films directed by Maurice Cloche
1950s fantasy comedy-drama films
1950s musical fantasy films
French ghost films
1953 comedy films
1953 drama films
1950s French films